Lamillothrips is a genus of thrips in the family Phlaeothripidae.

Species
 Lamillothrips aethiopicus
 Lamillothrips typicus
 Lamillothrips vitulus

References

Phlaeothripidae
Thrips
Thrips genera